The Petroleum Secretary of Pakistan is the Federal Secretary for Ministry of Energy (Petroleum Division). The officer is a BPS-22 grade officer, usually belonging to the Pakistan Administrative Service. The Secretary Petroleum is considered to be a highly lucrative and prized post in the Government of Pakistan. The Secretary heads the Division which is responsible to ensure availability and security of sustainable supply of oil and gas for economic development and strategic requirements of Pakistan, and to coordinate development of natural resources of energy and minerals. Mega-sized companies such as the Pakistan Petroleum Limited (PPL), Oil and Gas Development Company (OGDC) and Pakistan State Oil (PSO) come under the purview of Secretary Petroleum.

See also
Government of Pakistan
Commerce Secretary of Pakistan
Pakistan Secretary of Economic Affairs

References

Ministry of Energy (Pakistan)